In Boolean algebra, the inclusion relation  is defined as  and is the Boolean analogue to the subset relation in set theory. Inclusion is a partial order.

The inclusion relation  can be expressed in many ways:
 
 
 
 
 
 

The inclusion relation has a natural interpretation in various Boolean algebras: in the subset algebra, the subset relation; in arithmetic Boolean algebra, divisibility; in the algebra of propositions, material implication; in the two-element algebra, the set { (0,0), (0,1), (1,1) }.

Some useful properties of the inclusion relation are:
 
 

The inclusion relation may be used to define Boolean intervals such that . A Boolean algebra whose carrier set is restricted to the elements in an interval is itself a Boolean algebra.

References

 , Boolean Reasoning: The Logic of Boolean Equations, 2nd edition, 2003, p. 34, 52 

Boolean algebra